John Buckingham (March 21, 1943 – August 28, 2015) was a British chemist known for his authorship of several chemical dictionaries including the Dictionary of Natural Products.

Education and career 

John Buckingham won a scholarship to Haberdashers’ Aske's Boys' School at the age of 11. It was there that he discovered chemistry and chose to apply to the University of Southampton where he won a First Class Honours degree.  He gained his D.Phil. from the University of Sussex.

He became a lecturer in Chemistry in William Klyne’s department at Westfield College, University of London. Professor Klyne was writing a book on organic stereochemistry for Chapman & Hall and John’s expertise and attention to detail made him the ideal co-author. So the Atlas of Stereochemistry was published in 1974 to great reviews, with two subsequent volumes following a few years later.

John’s skills were recognized by the managing director at Chapman & Hall, Richard Stileman, who then engaged him on a full-time basis to prepare a new edition of the Heilbron’s Dictionary of Organic Compounds (DOC). This was a multi-volume reference work which needed bringing into the modern world with significant amendments required for the fifth edition. John was pivotal in converting the DOC into a database, and this now forms the basis of the modern DOC and its related dictionaries.

Once the DOC was published, John’s attention turned towards the chemistry of natural products such as alkaloids including strychnine and morphine, taxol. John had the foresight to anticipate the tremendous growth in natural products research and its relevance to the modern drug industry. His expertise with deciphering chemical literature and organising natural products by structure, coupled with his unflagging energy and enthusiasm, culminated in the publication of the Dictionary of Natural Products. This heralded a new phase of publishing with electronic products very much at the forefront. The CD ROM version of the Dictionary was published in 1991, two years before the book was published. It continues to be updated twice a year and John continued working on it full-time until the end. As Fiona Macdonald, the current editor of the Dictionary commented in a eulogy at his memorial service: "No other publication has ever achieved the breadth and depth of the Dictionary of Natural Products and today it is widely regarded as the benchmark in natural product information. John was very proud of its success and it truly is his life’s work and his legacy."

John Buckingham is buried in Kensal Green Cemetery in London, United Kingdom.

Notable works 
 Atlas of Stereochemistry: Absolute Configurations of Organic Molecules. (Springer 1974)
 Dictionary of Natural Products. (Chapman and Hall/CRC 1993)
 Dictionary of Organic Compounds, Sixth Edition. (Chapman and Hall/CRC 1995)
 Chasing the Molecule. (The History Press 2004)
 Bitter Nemesis: The Intimate History of Strychnine. (CRC Press 2007)
 Dictionary of Alkaloids, Second Edition. (CRC Press 2010)

References

 Snatzke, G. (1975), Book Review: Atlas of Stereochemistry. Absolute Configurations of Organic Molecules. By W. Klyne and J. Buckingham. Angew. Chem. Int. Ed. Engl., 14: 441–444. doi:10.1002/anie.197504412

British chemists
1943 births
People educated at Haberdashers' Boys' School 
Scientists from London
2015 deaths